Henry "Heinie" Kappel (September 1863 – August 27, 1905) was an American infielder in Major League Baseball who was born and died in Philadelphia. Kappel played three seasons in the major leagues with the Cincinnati Red Stockings (1887–1888) and the Columbus Solons (1889). Kappel played in 105 games: 49 games at shortstop, 33 at third base, and 16 at second base. As a batter, he had 54 hits, 51 runs batted in, and a .269 career batting average.

"Heinie" was a popular nickname for German baseball players in the early part of the 20th century; in fact, 22 Heinies have played in the major leagues, and Kappel was the first. The others are: Heinie Beckendorf, 1909–1910; Heinie Berger, 1907–1910; Heinie Elder, 1913–1913; Heinie Groh, 1912–1927, known for his use of the "bottle bat"; Heinie Heitmuller, 1909–1910; Heinie Heltzel, 1943–1944; Heinie Jantzen, 1912–1912; Heinie Manush, 1923–1939, the only Hall of Famer; Heinie Meine 1922–1934, also known as "The Count of Luxemburg"; Heinie Mueller, 1920–1935; Heinie Mueller, 1938–1941; Heinie Odom, 1925–1925; Heinie Peitz, 1892–1913; Heinie Reitz, 1893–1899; Heinie Sand, 1923–1928; Heinie Scheer, 1922–1923; Heinie Schuble, 1927–1936; Heinie Smith, 1897–1903; Heinie Stafford, 1916–1916; Heinie Wagner, 1902–1918; and Heinie Zimmerman, 1907–1919, implicated in the Chicago "Black Sox" scandal.

External links

1863 births
1905 deaths
Major League Baseball infielders
Cincinnati Red Stockings (AA) players
Columbus Solons players
Baseball players from Philadelphia
New Castle Neshannocks players
Augusta Browns players
Wilmington Blue Hens players
Atlantic City (minor league baseball) players
Syracuse Stars (minor league baseball) players
Chattanooga Lookouts players
Memphis Browns players
Davenport Hawkeyes players
Sioux City Corn Huskers players
Albany Senators players
Buffalo Bisons (minor league) players
Allentown-Bethlehem Colts players
Harrisburg Senators players
Bridgeton (minor league baseball) players
19th-century baseball players